The Deadly Trap is a 1971  suspense drama film directed by René Clément and set in France. It was screened at the 1971 Cannes Film Festival, but was not entered into the main competition.

Plot
Jill and her husband Philip are an American couple living in Paris together with their two small children. Philip is currently an office worker, but he used to be involved with some shady organization which now wants him to do one more job for them. Meanwhile, Jill and Philip are having marital problems, which are exacerbated by Jill's mental instability—she has memory lapses and paranoid suspicions of Philip being unfaithful. The couple also has a neighbor, Cynthia, who shows an unusual interest in their affairs. One day, when Jill is out for a walk with the children, they go missing. The couple contacts the police but Inspector Chameille, who leads the investigation, is unsure whether the children were actually kidnapped or harmed by their erratic mother.

Cast
 Faye Dunaway as Jill
 Frank Langella as Philippe
 Barbara Parkins as Cynthia
 Karen Blanguernon as Miss Hansen
 Raymond Gérôme as Commissaire Chameille
 Michele Lourie as Cathy (as Michèle Lourie)
 Patrick Vincent as Patrick
 Gérard Buhr as Le psychiatre / Psychiatrist
 Louise Chevalier
 Maurice Ronet as L'homme de l'organisation / Stranger
 Tener Eckelberry
 Massimo Farinelli
 Jill Larson
 Robert Lussac
 Franco Ressel
 Dora van der Groen

Reception
The film received mixed reviews upon release. Vincent Canby in The New York Times called it an "arbitrarily muddled" suspense melodrama where "nothing works", and that it "means to demonstrate...the limits of human patience." Time Out praised "Clément's nice Hitchcockian-flavoured style and deft use of menacingly 'ordinary' locations" but said that "the ending has an impact similar to the punchline of a shaggy dog story."

References

External links

1971 films
1971 drama films
1970s thriller drama films
French thriller drama films
English-language French films
Films directed by René Clément
Films with screenplays by Sidney Buchman
Films with screenplays by Ring Lardner Jr.
Films set in Paris
Films about couples
Films about families
1970s English-language films
1970s French films